The Purbeck Valley Folk Festival is a folk music festival held on the Isle of Purbeck in Dorset, England.

The inaugural event was organized in August 2009 near Kimmeridge Bay as the Purbeck Folk Festival. In 2014, the festival was held during 22–24 August at Wilkswood Farm, Langton Matravers, and had an attendance of 2,400 visitors. In 2015, the festival adopted its current name and moved to Purbeck Valley Farm in Harman's Cross.

The 2022 line-up included Martha Tilston who appeared on one of the stages.

References

External links 

Music festivals in Dorset
Isle of Purbeck
Folk festivals in the United Kingdom